The E7 (short for "Emerging 7") is the seven countries Brazil, China, India, Indonesia, Mexico, Russia and Turkey, grouped together because of their major emerging economies. The term was coined by the economists John Hawksworth and Gordon Cookson at PricewaterhouseCoopers in 2006.

The growth of the E7 countries has been characterized in comparison with its size versus the Group of Seven countries, which had made up many of the largest economies in the world in the 20th century. In 2011, the E7 were predicted to have larger economies than the G7 countries by 2020. By 2014, the E7 countries had passed the G7 countries based on purchasing power parity terms. Other estimates said the E7 were 80% of the G7 in 2016 in PPP. In 2016, another prediction estimated that the E7's economies would be larger than the G7 in 2030. PwC predicted that the E7 could be 75% larger than the G7 in PPP terms by 2050.

List 

The following table is an estimate for largest 10 economies by nominal GDP using PPP exchange rates for 2030 made by UK based Standard Chartered.

Below are the E7 countries and their predicted economies in 2050 as predicted by Goldman Sachs:

See also
 BRIC
 EAGLEs
 Goldman Sachs
 G6 (EU)
 Group of Eight
 G20

References

Intergovernmental organizations
2000s economic history
Economic country classifications